Kedar Singh Phonia (6 October 1930 – 14 October 2022) was an Indian politician and member of the Bharatiya Janata Party. Phonia was a member of the Uttarakhand Legislative Assembly from the Badrinath constituency in Chamoli district.

Phonia died on 14 October 2022, at the age of 92.

References 

1930 births
2022 deaths
21st-century Indian politicians
Bharatiya Janata Party politicians from Uttarakhand
Members of the Uttarakhand Legislative Assembly
People from Chamoli district